Stringos is a village and a community in the municipal unit of Tegea, Arcadia, Greece. It is situated in the plain of Tripoli, at 650 m above sea level. In 2011, it had a population of 123 for the village, and 210 for the community, which includes the village Demiri. Stringos is 1 km west of Kerasitsa and 7 km southeast of Tripoli. The Greek National Road 39/E961 (Tripoli – Sparta – Gytheio) passes east of the village.

Population

See also
List of settlements in Arcadia

References

External links
Stringos at the GTP Travel Pages
Demiri at the GTP Travel Pages

Populated places in Arcadia, Peloponnese